Edin Gačić (01 September 1976 – 12 February 2019) was a Bosnian serial killer who murdered four people between 1998 and 2019. He is the only known serial killer to ever exist in Bosnia and Herzegovina's entire criminal history.

Early life and crimes 
Gačić was born in Banja Luka in SR Bosnia and Herzegovina in 1976. According to his statements given to the police agencies during his arrest, he was sexually abused as a child.

During the Bosnian War, he served in the El-Mudžahid military detachment of the 3rd Corps of ARBiH from 1993 to 1995. After the war, he killed his fellow soldier Ismet Gunić in 1998, for which he was sentenced to 14 years in prison the following year in 1999. 

While on a weekend leave from prison, he shot and killed his mother Sifeta in the Bosnian town of Zenica in August of 2002. The court subsequently handed down a cumulative sentence of 20 years in prison for Gačić. He returned to prison, being released again 15 years later. 

After his release from prison, he did not commit any crimes, and was staying in Banja Luka until he sold his apartment and moved to Konjic. However in 2019, he shot and killed two other men, Suad Sultanić, who was his neighbour and a shop owner in Konjic, and later he shot and killed Mahir Begić, who was a policeman, in Tarčin.

Death 
After the murder of Begić, the State Investigation and Protection Agency (SIPA) issued a nationwide manhunt against Gačić. Within eight days of continued searching, he was found in the Lepenica settlement near Kiseljak. During that time, Gačić engaged with the police in an armed confrontation, and he was shot and killed on 12 February 2019.

References 

1976 births
2019 deaths
Bosnia and Herzegovina people convicted of murder
Bosnia and Herzegovina serial killers
Deaths by firearm in Bosnia and Herzegovina
Escapees
Male serial killers
Matricides
People from Banja Luka
People shot dead by law enforcement officers